KZYX (90.7 FM), is a National Public Radio member station in Philo, California.  The studios are located at 9300 Highway 128 in Philo, CA, and the transmitter is located on Cold Springs Mountain (near Philo, CA) in the State of California Department of Forestry and Fire Protection (CDF) radio facility.

It maintains co-channel booster KZYX-FM1 in Ukiah, as well as satellite station KZYZ 91.5 FM in Willits, and translator K201HR 88.1 FM in Fort Bragg.

KZYX is a non profit community radio station located in rural northern California. Serving all of Mendocino county and reaching into Lake county, northern Sonoma county, and southern Humboldt county since 1989. Also streaming online at www.kzyx.org

MCPB Mission Statement

Mendocino County Public Broadcasting

Since 1989, KZYX&Z has been the community non-commercial radio station of Mendocino County, with a reach including Humboldt, Lake, and Sonoma counties, and streaming online to serve listeners around the world.

More than 100 volunteer programmers and a handful of staff members keep KZYX on the air 24 hours a day, 7 days a week. KZYX is committed to broadcasting vital emergency information, local news, NPR programming, music, performing arts, quality entertainment, and timely local, national, and international public affairs.

The core mission of KZYX&Z is to promote community through increased communication, cultural offerings, diverse voices, and access to important information among all groups in this large and varied listening area.

This effort is only made possible by the generous donors and local businesses who believe that public radio has the power to connect everyone in our community.

See also
List of community radio stations in the United States

References

External links
 http://kzyx.mcn.org:4000/kzyxlive.m3u
 http://kzyx.mymcn.org/index.php/listenlivenow 
 http://jukebox.kzyx.org/
KZYX
 KZYX official website
 
KZYZ
 
K201HR
 
 

NPR member stations
Community radio stations in the United States
Companies based in Mendocino County, California
ZYX